Cemal Yıldırım (1925–2009) was a Turkish philosopher, author, educator, and researcher. He wrote 15 books (4 in English and 11 in Turkish) and numerous academic papers.

He wrote extensively on the philosophy of science and the history of science. His popular books Bilimin Öncüleri ("Pioneers of Science") and Evrim Kuramı ve Bagnazlık ("Theory of Evolution and Dogmatism") were widely read and discussed in Turkey. His book Matematiksel Düşünme ("Mathematical Thinking") was also very influential.

He was the father of the mathematician Cem Yıldırım.

Books 
 The Patterns of Scientific Discovery, M.E.T.U. Publications (1981)
 Logic: The Study of Deductive Reasoning, M.E.T.U. Publications (1973)
 Science: Its Meaning and Method, M.E.T.U. Publications (1971)
 The Logic of Value Judgments, M.E.T.U. Publications (1965)
 Bilimsel Düşünme Yöntemi ("Method of Scientific Thinking"), Bilgi Yayınevi (1997), 
 Bilimin Öncüleri ("Pioneers of Science"), TÜBİTAK Publications (1996), 
 Matematiksel Düşünme ("Mathematical Thinking"), Remzi Kitabevi (1996),  
 Evrim Kuramı ve Bagnazlık ("Theory of Evolution and Dogmatism"), Bilgi Yayinlari (1989) 
 Mantık: Doğru Düşünme Yöntemi ("Logic: The Method to Thinking Correctly"), Verso Yayınları (1987). 
 Bilim Tarihi ("History of Science"),  Remzi Kitabevi (1983), 
 Bilim Felsefesi ("Philosophy of Science"), Remzi Kitabevi (1979), 

1925 births
2009 deaths
20th-century Turkish philosophers
Historians of science
Turkish logicians
Philosophers of science